The Nebraska Panhandle is an area in the western part of the state of Nebraska and one of several U.S. state panhandles, or elongated geographical regions that extend from their main political entity.

The Nebraska panhandle is two-thirds as broad as the rest of the state. The Nebraska panhandle roughly encompasses the area in Nebraska between 102° and 104°W longitude and 41° and 43°N latitude. Its population as of the 2010 Census was 87,789 inhabitants, or about 4.70 percent of the state's population. Its largest city is Scottsbluff, in the west-central part of the area.

Counties

Cities and towns
Major cities in the Nebraska panhandle include:

Alliance
Chadron
Kimball
Scottsbluff - Gering
Sidney
Bridgeport
Hemingford

Population shifts
As part of a general trend in migration from rural to metropolitan areas, most counties in the Nebraska panhandle have seen population decreases in recent decades; however, Scotts Bluff, Dawes, and Cheyenne counties increased their populations from the years 1990 to 2000 and again from 2000 to 2010. While emigration from the Panhandle exceeds immigration, a study coordinated by the University of Nebraska–Lincoln surveyed and interviewed a sample of newcomers to the region in order to understand their demographic makeup and reasons for relocation. Results indicated that immigrants to the Nebraska panhandle were on average younger and had higher average incomes and educational levels than other area residents; immigrants cited a "simpler pace of life," reduced congestion, and lower costs of living among their reasons for relocation.

Points of interest
The Nebraska panhandle has a great deal of geographical and geological diversity; the region itself is made up of several smaller areas. Areas, features, and sites of interest in the Nebraska panhandle include:
Agate Fossil Beds National Monument
Carhenge
Chadron State Park
Sandhills
Chimney Rock
Fort Robinson
Pine Ridge
Toadstool Geologic Park
Scotts Bluff National Monument
Wildcat Hills
North Platte River

The Nebraska panhandle borders the states of South Dakota, Wyoming and Colorado and is in the Mountain Time Zone.

See also
  List of airports in the Nebraska Panhandle

References

External links

Regions of Nebraska